The Undateables was a British reality television series that follows a range of people on dates who have long term conditions, including: disabilities, developmental disorders, neurodevelopmental conditions, and learning difficulties. The series worked in conjunction with the dating agency, Flame Introductions, and was broadcast on Channel 4. 53 main episodes aired since the documentary first aired on 3 April 2012, split into eleven separate series. The documentary has been narrated by Sally Phillips throughout.

Transmissions

Episodes

Series 1

Series 2

Series 3

Series 4

Series 5

Series 6

Series 7

Series 8

Series 9

Series 10

Series 11

Additional episodes

Controversy 
Early controversy was generated from newspapers such as The Mirror and The Guardian, due to the word "undateable" being used in the title to describe people with mental and physical disabilities. Channel 4 claimed that the title of the series is based upon society's preconceptions of these people. The Undateables faced significant backlash from doctors who branded the show "offensive" and "exploitative". Dr. Rachael Pickering said that the series had left her "disturbed at being part of a society that might seek to view disabled people as a source of comedy". She also spoke with the BMA (British Medical Association) annual representatives about the danger of patients being exploited by the TV documentary. In an interview with Holly Willoughby and Phillip Schofield on This Morning, two stars of the then-upcoming fifth series, Tammy and James, responded to the assertions, with Tammy stating that she found it "quite insulting" that she "would be exploited in any way." She added, "Just because I’m disfigured, I’m not stupid."

Awards and nominations

References

External links

2012 British television series debuts
2020 British television series endings
2010s British documentary television series
2010s British reality television series
2020s British documentary television series
2020s British reality television series
British dating and relationship reality television series
Channel 4 documentaries
Television series by All3Media
English-language television shows